José Álvarez Crespo (born 10 May 1945) is a Mexican former footballer who competed in the 1968 Summer Olympics.

References

External links

1945 births
Living people
Footballers from Mexico City
Association football forwards
Olympic footballers of Mexico
Footballers at the 1968 Summer Olympics
Mexico international footballers
Mexican footballers